Petroleum Air Services (PAS) ( Khidmāt al-Bitrūl al-Gawwīyyah) is an airline based in Cairo, Egypt. It operates helicopter services to support the oil industry. The airline also operates commercial passenger services within Egypt and the regional cities. Its main base is Cairo International Airport.

History 
The airline was established and started operations in 1982. It is owned by Egyptian General Petroleum Corporation (75%) and Bristow Group Inc. (25%).

The airline's headquarters is in Nasr City, Doctor Batrawy Street; it moved operations there in 1990.

During the 2011 Dubai Airshow, the airline signed an order with Bombardier for their first jet aircraft, the Bombardier CRJ900. The aircraft will be delivered in 2012.

In 2016 Petroleum Air Services becomes an Authorized Customer Service Facility for Bell Helicopter.

Operations

Main Operations 

PAS's main operations focus on serving the petroleum industry in Egypt. All petroleum operations are conducted and flown by the Bell-212, Bell-412, Bell-206, Eurocopter-135 and AgustaWestland AW139helicopters.

The main bases/cities of operations are:

Alexandria – Port Said – Sidi Kerir – Abu Rudeis – Ras Gharib – Ras Shukeir

Charter Flights 

PAS Air provides charter flights to all domestic destinations inside Egypt plus other international destinations within the region

VIP Flights 

PAS Air operates the Bombardier DHC-8 and CRJ-900 airplanes, regional category Aircraft. PAS offer also Helicopter VIP flight to domestic destinations.

Airline Feeder Services 

PAS is capable of providing Tour Operators, Aerial Photography,  Petroleum Industry Flights, and short flights to connect with other scheduled airline flights through PAS's fleet of Airplanes and Helicopters.

Fleet
The Petroleum Air Services fleet consists of the following (fixed-wing) aircraft (as of August 2020):

Old Fleet Historie: De Havilland Canada DHC-7-100,

References

External links

PAS Fleet

Airlines of Egypt
Airlines established in 1982
Companies based in Cairo
Helicopter airlines
Oil and gas companies of Egypt
Egyptian companies established in 1982